The Thames River  is located in southwestern Ontario, Canada.

The Thames flows southwestly  through southwestern Ontario, from the Town of Tavistock through the cities of Woodstock, London and Chatham to Lighthouse Cove on Lake St. Clair.

The river is also known as Deshkaan-ziibi / Eshkani-ziibi ("Antler River") in the Ojibwe language, spoken by Anishnaabe peoples who, along with the Neutrals prior to the disappearance in the 17th century, have lived in the area since before Europeans arrived. This name was anglisized as "Escunnisepe" as the first English name of the river. In 1793, Lieutenant Governor John Graves Simcoe named the river after the River Thames in England. Early French Canadians referred to it as La Tranche, for the wide and muddy waters of its lower section.

Much of the Thames was formerly surrounded by deciduous Carolinian forests, but much of this forest has been cleared to permit agriculture and other forms of development.

Two conservation authorities together have jurisdiction over the Thames River watershed, the Upper Thames River Conservation Authority and Lower Thames Valley Conservation Authority, and work to prevent damaging floods and undertake other resource management activities.

Course

There are three rivers in the watershed with Thames in the name—the Thames River itself, North Thames River, and Middle Thames River. These are also known locally as South Branch, North Branch, and Middle Branch. The South Branch, which begins as several field drains near Tavistock and initially flows southeasterly before turning southwesterly towards Woodstock, is the main stem Thames River and officially carries the Thames River name.

The Thames River and North Thames River in the upper part of the watershed flow through valleys created during the retreat of the glaciers during the last ice age. The Thames River and North Thames River meet in central London at the "Forks"; the University of Western Ontario is located north of the Forks at the north branch's confluence with Medway Creek. The Middle Thames River runs north of the Thames River joining it west of Ingersoll. Urban areas the lower Thames flows through include Delaware, Chatham, Thamesville, as well as Chippewa and Oneida First Nations settlements. Tributaries of the three Thames Rivers include the Avon River, Dingman Creek, Jeanettes Creek, McGregor Creek, Medway Creek, Pottersburg Creek, Stoney Creek, Trout Creek and Waubuno Creek.

Three separate dams are used to control seasonal flooding in the watershed: Wildwood Dam, located on Trout Creek which flows into the North Thames River; Pittock Dam, located on the Thames River near Woodstock; and Fanshawe Dam located on the North Thames River in the northeasterly area of London. A fourth dam at Springbank Park, downstream from the Forks, controlled water levels in central London from the 1870s until 2005 when it was closed for rehabilitation. One of the Springbank Dam's gates failed in 2008, causing the dam to be locked in the open position, and rehabilitation was delayed pending litigation between an engineering firm and the City of London. On January 9, 2018, London's civic works committee voted to decommission the Springbank Dam permanently.

History
The river was the location of an important battle of the War of 1812. The Battle of the Thames (also known as the Battle of Youwas fought on October 5, 1813, between American General William Henry Harrison and British General Henry Proctor, along with Proctor's ally Tecumseh. Chief Tecumseh was killed in the battle.

On May 25, 1881, the river steamer 'Victoria' capsized and sank killing 182 passengers. After the disaster all ferries could only carry their maximum capacity.

In the early morning hours of July 11, 1883, London flooded from heavy rainfall.
The ferry "Princess Louise" was forced over Waterworks Dam and capsized killing 7.

On August 25, 1899, the propeller-boat "Thames" was set on fire and eventually sunk only feet from Waterworks Dam.

On August 13, 1950, a launch capsized and killed four passengers.

On August 14, 2000, the Thames River was designated a Canadian Heritage River.

During the weekend of February 24–25, 2018, abnormally persistent rains caused significant flooding along the banks of the river. Extensive property damage was observed in Chatham and nearby Thamesville.

Natural history

The Thames River is home to about 90 species of fish and 30 species of freshwater mussel. As one of the southern-most rivers in Canada, many of the species found in its waters are found almost nowhere else in the country, and a number are legally protected as species at risk, including Blanding's turtle, northern map turtle, common snapping turtle, stinkpot turtle, spiny softshell turtle, spotted turtle, northern ribbon snake, queen snake, kidneyshell, rainbow mussel, round pigtoe, wavy-rayed lampmussel, gravel chub, northern madtom, black redhorse, eastern sand darter, northern brook lamprey, pugnose minnow, river redhorse, silver shiner, and spotted sucker.

References

External links

Upper Thames River Conservation Authority
Lower Thames Valley Conservation Authority
City of London Web site
Thames River, Natural Resources Canada, Geographical Names Board of Canada Place names - Thames River

Canadian Heritage Rivers
Lake St. Clair
Landforms of London, Ontario
Rivers of Middlesex County, Ontario